RockPaperScissors is a 2006 album by Canadian electronic musician Michael Brook.

"When not recording in his Lavanderia studio located in the Hollywood Hills, Michael and his co-producer, multi-instrumentalist and arranger Rich Evans (of Peter Gabriel's band) traveled to Sofia, Bulgaria on behalf of this ambitious project, where they recorded local orchestral and choral ensembles. Into this mix, Brook introduced several vocalist/songwriters such as his former 4AD label mate Lisa Germano, Shira Myrow and Paul Buchanan from the Blue Nile".

Reception 
YouTube music critic Darren Lock gave a generally positive review of the album, giving it a score of 3.5/5, however he noted that the album might've been too long with the addition of the two "Pasadena" tracks.

Track listing

"Strange Procession" – 4:56
"Want" featuring Lisa Germano – 3:53 
"Doges" – 3:55 
"Darker Room" featuring Sir Richard Burton – 6:05 
"Rock Paper Scissors" featuring Paul Buchanan – 3:54 
"Tangerine" – 3:05 
"Light Star" – 4:56 
"Pond" featuring Nusrat Fateh Ali Khan – 4:18 
"Silverized" – 3:52 
"Pasadena, Part 1" featuring Ben Christophers – 3:14 
"Pasadena, Part 2" – 11:08

Musicians
Ramy Autoun: drums
Michael Brook: guitar, programming
Paul Buchanan: vocals
Bulgarian Studio Orchestra, Conductor in Bulgaria: Ognian Mitonov
Richard Evans: string arrangement
Shira Myrow: backing vocals
Quinn: percussion
Brett Simons: bass

Writing and production
Shira Myrow (Shira Myrow Music/ASCAP)
Michael Brook (Canadian Rational/ASCAP)
Produced by Michael Brook and Richard Evans
Executive Producer/A&R: Hugo Vereker
Recorded by Richard Evans, Michael Brook and Craig Conard. Additional engineering by David Donaldson

References

Michael Brook albums
2006 albums